Ronald or Ron Evans may refer to:

 Ronald Evans (astronaut) (1933–1990), American naval officer and astronaut
 Ronald Evans (rugby league) (1933–2010), English rugby league footballer
 Ronald G. Evans (1915–1992), American businessman and politician
 Ronald M. Evans (born 1949), American professor and biologist
 Ron Evans (1939–2007), Australian rules footballer and executive
 Ron J. Evans (1926–2004), Australian rules footballer
 Ron Evans (politician) (born 1957), clergyman and politician in Manitoba, Canada
 Ron Evans (cricketer) (1922–1993), English cricketer